This is a list of flag bearers who have represented Denmark at the Olympics.

Flag bearers carry the national flag of their country at the opening ceremony of the Olympic Games.

See also
Denmark at the Olympics

References

Denmark at the Olympics
Denmark
Olympic flagbearers